Nogometni klub Peca, commonly referred to as NK Peca, is a Slovenian football club which plays in the town of Črna na Koroškem. The club was established in 1962.
They competes in the 1. MNZ League, the fourth tier football league in Slovenia.

Honours
Slovenian Fifth Division
 Winners: 2004–05

References

External links
Official website 

Association football clubs established in 1962
Football clubs in Slovenia
1962 establishments in Slovenia